Jashinea is a genus of horse flies in the family Tabanidae.

Species
Jashinea aurantiaca Fain & Elsen, 1981
Jashinea engleberti Leclercq, 1991
Jashinea jacoti (Bouvier, 1936)
Jashinea lugubris (Austen, 1937)
Jashinea pertusa (Loew, 1858)
Jashinea praestabilis (Grünberg, 1913)
Jashinea rodhaini (Bequaert, 1913)

References

Brachycera genera
Tabanidae
Diptera of Africa
Taxa named by Harold Oldroyd